Genocide is the intentional destruction of a people in whole or in part. Raphael Lemkin coined the term in 1944, combining the Greek word  ("race, people") with the Latin suffix  ("act of killing").

In 1948, the United Nations Genocide Convention defined genocide as any of five "acts committed with intent to destroy, in whole or in part, a national, ethnical, racial or religious group." These five acts were: killing members of the group, causing them serious bodily or mental harm, imposing living conditions intended to destroy the group, preventing births, and forcibly transferring children out of the group. Victims are targeted because of their real or perceived membership of a group, not randomly.

The Political Instability Task Force estimated that 43 genocides occurred between 1956 and 2016, resulting in about 50 million deaths. The UNHCR estimated that a further 50 million had been displaced by such episodes of violence up to 2008. Genocide, especially large-scale genocide, is widely considered to signify the epitome of human evil. As a label, it is contentious because it is moralizing, and has been used as a type of moral category since the late 1990s.

Etymology 

Before the term genocide was coined, there were various ways of describing such events. Some languages already had words for such killings, including German and Polish. In 1941, when describing the "methodical, merciless butchery" of "scores of thousands" of Russians by Nazi troops during the German invasion of the Soviet Union, Winston Churchill spoke of "a crime without a name". In 1944, Raphael Lemkin coined the term genocide as a hybrid combination of the Ancient Greek word  'race, people' with the Latin , 'to kill'; his book Axis Rule in Occupied Europe (1944) describes the implementation of Nazi policies in occupied Europe and mentions earlier mass killings.
After reading about the 1921 assassination of Talat Pasha, the main architect of the Armenian genocide, by Armenian Soghomon Tehlirian, Lemkin asked his professor why there was no law under which Talat could be charged. He later explained that "as a lawyer, I thought that a crime should not be punished by the victims, but should be punished by a court."

Lemkin defined genocide as follows:

The preamble to the 1948 Genocide Convention (CPPCG) notes that instances of genocide have taken place throughout history; it was not until Lemkin coined the term and the prosecution of perpetrators of the Holocaust at the Nuremberg Trials that the United Nations defined the crime of genocide under international law in the Genocide Convention. It was several years before the term was widely adopted by the international community. When the Nuremberg trials revealed the inadequacy of phrases like "Germanization", "crimes against humanity" and "mass murder", scholars of international law reached agreement that Lemkin's work provided a conceptual framework for Nazi crimes. A 1946 headline in The New York Times announced that "Genocide Is the New Name for the Crime Fastened on the Nazi Leaders"; the word was used in indictments at the Nuremberg trials, held from 1945, but solely as a descriptive term, not yet as a formal legal term. The so-called Polish Genocide Trials of Arthur Greiser and Amon Leopold Goth in 1946 were the first trials in which judgments included the term.

Prohibited acts 
The Genocide Convention establishes five prohibited acts that, when committed with the requisite intent, amount to genocide. Although massacre-style killings are the most commonly identified and punished as genocide, the range of violence that is contemplated by the law is significantly broader.

Killing members of the group 
While mass killing is not necessary for genocide to have been committed, it has been present in almost all recognized genocides. A near-uniform pattern has emerged throughout history in which men and adolescent boys are singled out for murder in the early stages, such as in the genocide of the Yazidis by Daesh, the Ottoman Turks' attack on the Armenians, and the Burmese security forces' attacks on the Rohingya. Men and boys are typically subject to "fast" killings, such as by gunshot. Women and girls are more likely to die slower deaths by slashing, burning, or as a result of sexual violence. The jurisprudence of the International Criminal Tribunal for Rwanda (ICTR), among others, shows that both the initial executions and those that quickly follow other acts of extreme violence, such as rape and torture, are recognized as falling under the first prohibited act.

A less settled discussion is whether deaths that are further removed from the initial acts of violence can be addressed under this provision of the Genocide Convention. Legal scholars have posited, for example, that deaths resulting from other genocidal acts including causing serious bodily or mental harm or the successful deliberate infliction of conditions of life calculated to bring about physical destruction should be considered genocidal killings.

Causing serious bodily or mental harm to members of the group Article II(b) 
This second prohibited act can encompass a wide range of non-fatal genocidal acts. The ICTR and International Criminal Tribunal for the former Yugoslavia (ICTY) have held that rape and sexual violence may constitute the second prohibited act of genocide by causing both physical and mental harm. In its landmark Akayesu decision, the ICTR held that rapes and sexual violence resulted in "physical and psychological destruction". Sexual violence is a hallmark of genocidal violence, with most genocidal campaigns explicitly or implicitly sanctioning it. It is estimated that 250,000 to 500,000 women were raped in the three months of the Rwandan genocide, many of whom were subjected to multiple rapes or gang rape. In Darfur, a systemic campaign of rape and often sexual mutilation was carried out and in Burma public mass rapes and gang rapes were inflicted on the Rohingya by Burmese security forces. Sexual slavery was documented in the Armenian genocide by the Ottoman Turks and Daesh's genocide of the Yazidi.

Torture and other cruel, inhuman, or degrading treatment or punishment, when committed with the requisite intent, are also genocide by causing serious bodily or mental harm to members of the group. The ICTY found that both experiencing a failed execution and watching the murder of one's family members may constitute torture. The Syrian Commission of Inquiry (COI) also found that enslavement, removal of one's children into indoctrination or sexual slavery, and acts of physical and sexual violence rise to the level of torture, as well. While it was subject to some debate, the ICTY and, later, the Syrian COI held that under some circumstances deportation and forcible transfer may also cause serious bodily or mental harm.

Deliberately inflicting on the group conditions of life calculated to bring about its physical destruction 

The third prohibited act is distinguished from the genocidal act of killing because the deaths are not immediate (or may not even come to pass), but rather create circumstances that do not support prolonged life. Due to the longer period of time before the actual destruction would be achieved, the ICTR held that courts must consider the duration of time the conditions are imposed as an element of the act. In the 19th century the United States federal government supported the extermination of bison, which Native Americans in the Great Plains relied on as a source of food. This was done for various reasons, primarily to pressure them onto reservations during times of conflict. Some genocide experts describe this as an example of genocide that involves removing the means of survival.

The ICTR provided guidance into what constitutes a violation of the third act. In Akayesu, it identified "subjecting a group of people to a subsistence diet, systematic expulsion from homes and the reduction of essential medical services below minimum requirement" as rising to genocide. In Kayishema and Ruzindana, it extended the list to include: "lack of proper housing, clothing, hygiene and medical care or excessive work or physical exertion" among the conditions. It further noted that, in addition to deprivation of necessary resources, rape could also fit within this prohibited act.

Imposing measures intended to prevent births within the group 

The fourth prohibited act is aimed at preventing the protected group from regenerating through reproduction. It encompasses acts with the single intent of affecting reproduction and intimate relationships, such as involuntary sterilization, forced abortion, the prohibition of marriage, and long-term separation of men and women intended to prevent procreation. Rape has been found to violate the fourth prohibited act on two bases: where the rape was committed with the intent to impregnate a woman and thereby force her to carry a child of another group (in societies where group identity is determined by patrilineal identity) and where the person raped subsequently refuses to procreate as a result of the trauma. Accordingly, it can take into account both physical and mental measures imposed by the perpetrators.

Forcibly transferring children of the group to another group 

The final prohibited act is the only prohibited act that does not lead to physical or biological destruction, but rather to destruction of the group as a cultural and social unit. It occurs when children of the protected group are transferred to the perpetrator group. Boys are typically taken into the group by changing their names to those common of the perpetrator group, converting their religion, and using them for labor or as soldiers. Girls who are transferred are not generally converted to the perpetrator group, but instead treated as chattel, as played out in both the Yazidi and Armenian genocides.

Crime

Pre-criminalization view 
Before genocide was made a crime against national law, it was considered a sovereign right. When Lemkin asked about a way to punish the perpetrators of the Armenian genocide, a law professor told him: "Consider the case of a farmer who owns a flock of chickens. He kills them and this is his business. If you interfere, you are trespassing." As late as 1959, many world leaders still "believed states had a right to commit genocide against people within their borders", according to political scientist Douglas Irvin-Erickson.

International law 

After the Holocaust, which had been perpetrated by Nazi Germany prior to and during World War II, Lemkin successfully campaigned for the universal acceptance of international laws defining and forbidding genocides. In 1946, the first session of the United Nations General Assembly adopted a resolution that affirmed genocide was a crime under international law and enumerated examples of such events (but did not provide a full legal definition of the crime). In 1948, the UN General Assembly adopted the Convention on the Prevention and Punishment of the Crime of Genocide (CPPCG) which defined the crime of genocide for the first time.

The CPPCG was adopted by the UN General Assembly on 9 December 1948 and came into effect on 12 January 1951 (Resolution 260 (III)). It contains an internationally recognized definition of genocide which has been incorporated into the national criminal legislation of many countries and was also adopted by the Rome Statute of the International Criminal Court, which established the International Criminal Court (ICC). Article II of the Convention defines genocide as:

Incitement to genocide is recognized as a separate crime under international law and an inchoate crime which does not require genocide to have taken place to be prosecutable.

The first draft of the convention included political killings; these provisions were removed in a political and diplomatic compromise following objections from many diverse countries, and originally promoted by the World Jewish Congress and Raphael Lemkin's conception, with some scholars popularly emphasizing in literature the role of the Soviet Union, a permanent United Nations Security Council member. The Soviets argued that the convention's definition should follow the etymology of the term, and Joseph Stalin in particular may have feared greater international scrutiny of the country's political killings, such as the Great Purge. Lemkin, who coined genocide, approached the Soviet delegation as the resolution vote came close to reassure the Soviets that there was no conspiracy against them; none in the Soviet-led bloc opposed the resolution, which passed unanimously in December 1946. Other nations, including the United States, feared that including political groups in the definition would invite international intervention in domestic politics.

By 1951, Lemkin was saying that the Soviet Union was the only state that could be indicted for genocide, his concept of genocide, as outlined in Axis Rule in Occupied Europe, covering Stalinist deportations as genocide by default, and differing in many ways from the adopted Genocide Convention. From a 21st-century perspective, it was such a broad coverage that it would include any grossly human rights violation as genocide, and that many events deemed by Lemkin genocidal did not amount to genocide. As the Cold War began, this change was the result of Lemkin's turn to anti-communism in an attempt to convince the United States to ratify the Genocide Convention.

Intent 
Under international law, genocide has two mental (mens rea) elements: the general mental element and the element of specific intent (dolus specialis). The general element refers to whether the prohibited acts were committed with intent, knowledge, recklessness, or negligence. For most serious international crimes, including genocide, the requirement is that the perpetrator act with intent. The Rome Statute defines intent as meaning to engage in the conduct and, in relation to consequences, as meaning to cause that consequence or being "aware that it will occur in the ordinary course of events".

The specific intent element defines the purpose of committing the acts: "to destroy in whole or in part, a national, ethnical, racial or religious group, as such". The specific intent is a core factor distinguishing genocide from other international crimes, such as war crimes or crimes against humanity.

"Intent to destroy" 

In 2007, the European Court of Human Rights (ECHR) noted in its judgement on Jorgic v. Germany case that, in 1992, the majority of legal scholars took the narrow view that "intent to destroy" in the CPPCG meant the intended physical-biological destruction of the protected group, and that this was still the majority opinion. But the ECHR also noted that a minority took a broader view, and did not consider biological-physical destruction to be necessary, as the intent to destroy a national, racial, religious or ethnic group was enough to qualify as genocide.

In the same judgement, the ECHR reviewed the judgements of several international and municipal courts. It noted that the International Criminal Tribunal for the former Yugoslavia and the International Court of Justice had agreed with the narrow interpretation (that biological-physical destruction was necessary for an act to qualify as genocide). The ECHR also noted that at the time of its judgement, apart from courts in Germany (which had taken a broad view), that there had been few cases of genocide under other Convention states' municipal laws, and that "There are no reported cases in which the courts of these States have defined the type of group destruction the perpetrator must have intended in order to be found guilty of genocide."

In the case of "Onesphore Rwabukombe", the German Federal Court of Justice adhered to its previous judgement, and did not follow the narrow interpretation of the ICTY and the ICJ.

"In whole or in part" 
The phrase "in whole or in part" has been subject to much discussion by scholars of international humanitarian law. In the Ruhashyankiko report of the United Nations it was once argued that the killing of only a single individual could be genocide if the intent to destroy the wider group was found in the murder, yet official court rulings have since contradicted this. The International Criminal Tribunal for the Former Yugoslavia found in Prosecutor v. Radislav Krstic – Trial Chamber I – Judgment – IT-98-33 (2001) ICTY8 (2 August 2001) that Genocide had been committed. In Prosecutor v. Radislav Krstic – Appeals Chamber – Judgment – IT-98-33 (2004) ICTY 7 (19 April 2004) paragraphs 8, 9, 10, and 11 addressed the issue of in part and found that "the part must be a substantial part of that group. The aim of the Genocide Convention is to prevent the intentional destruction of entire human groups, and the part targeted must be significant enough to have an impact on the group as a whole." The Appeals Chamber goes into details of other cases and the opinions of respected commentators on the Genocide Convention to explain how they came to this conclusion.

The judges continue in paragraph 12, "The determination of when the targeted part is substantial enough to meet this requirement may involve a number of considerations. The numeric size of the targeted part of the group is the necessary and important starting point, though not in all cases the ending point of the inquiry. The number of individuals targeted should be evaluated not only in absolute terms but also in relation to the overall size of the entire group. In addition to the numeric size of the targeted portion, its prominence within the group can be a useful consideration. If a specific part of the group is emblematic of the overall group or is essential to its survival, that may support a finding that the part qualifies as substantial within the meaning of Article 4 [of the Tribunal's Statute]."

In paragraph 13 the judges raise the issue of the perpetrators' access to the victims: "The historical examples of genocide also suggest that the area of the perpetrators' activity and control, as well as the possible extent of their reach, should be considered. ... The intent to destroy formed by a perpetrator of genocide will always be limited by the opportunity presented to him. While this factor alone will not indicate whether the targeted group is substantial, it can—in combination with other factors—inform the analysis."

"A national, ethnic, racial or religious group" 
The drafters of the CPPCG chose not to include political or social groups among the protected groups. Instead, they opted to focus on "stable" identities, attributes that are historically understood as being born into and unable or unlikely to change over time. This definition conflicts with modern conceptions of race as a social construct rather than innate fact and the practice of changing religion, etc.

International criminal courts have typically applied a mix of objective and subjective markers for determining whether or not a targeted population is a distinct group. Differences in language, physical appearance, religion, and cultural practices are objective criteria that may show that the groups are distinct. However, in circumstances such as the Rwandan genocide, Hutus and Tutsis were often physically indistinguishable.

In such a situation where a definitive answer based on objective markers is not clear, courts have turned to the subjective standard that "if a victim was perceived by a perpetrator as belonging to a protected group, the victim could be considered by the Chamber as a member of the protected group". Stigmatization of the group by the perpetrators through legal measures, such as withholding citizenship, requiring the group to be identified, or isolating them from the whole could show that the perpetrators viewed the victims as a protected group.

Convention on the Prevention and Punishment of the Crime of Genocide 
The convention came into force as international law on 12 January 1951 after the minimum 20 countries became parties. At that time however, only two of the five permanent members of the UN Security Council were parties to the treaty: France and the Republic of China. The Soviet Union ratified in 1954, the United Kingdom in 1970, the People's Republic of China in 1983 (having replaced the Taiwan-based Republic of China on the UNSC in 1971), and the United States in 1988.

William Schabas has suggested that a permanent body as recommended by the Whitaker Report to monitor the implementation of the Genocide Convention, and require states to issue reports on their compliance with the convention (such as were incorporated into the United Nations Optional Protocol to the Convention against Torture), would make the convention more effective.

UN Security Council Resolution 1674 
UN Security Council Resolution 1674, adopted by the United Nations Security Council on 28 April 2006, "reaffirms the provisions of paragraphs 138 and 139 of the 2005 World Summit Outcome Document regarding the responsibility to protect populations from genocide, war crimes, ethnic cleansing and crimes against humanity". The resolution committed the council to action to protect civilians in armed conflict.

In 2008 the UN Security Council adopted resolution 1820, which noted that "rape and other forms of sexual violence can constitute war crimes, crimes against humanity or a constitutive act with respect to genocide".

Municipal law 

Since the Convention came into effect in January 1951 about 80 United Nations member states have passed legislation that incorporates the provisions of CPPCG into their municipal law.

Other definitions of genocide 

Writing in 1998, Kurt Jonassohn and Karin Björnson stated that the CPPCG was a legal instrument resulting from a diplomatic compromise. As such the wording of the treaty is not intended to be a definition suitable as a research tool, and although it is used for this purpose, as it has international legal credibility that others lack, other genocide definitions have also been proposed. They go on to say that none of these alternative definitions have gained widespread support, they postulate that the major reason why no generally accepted genocide definition has emerged is because academics have adjusted their focus to emphasise different periods and have found it expedient to use slightly different definitions. For example, Frank Chalk and Kurt Jonassohn studied all human history, while Leo Kuper and Rudolph Rummel  concentrated on the 20th century, and Helen Fein, Barbara Harff, and Ted Gurr looked at post-World War II events.

Yehuda Bauer, has argued that the present definition is problematic, contending that many of what are usually called genocides were not racially motivated. Bauer gave the Rwandan Genocide, where, Bauer argued, both the perpetrators and victims were of the same ethnicity, as an example. He argued that, because of this discrepancy, "clearly, the existing definition of genocide is inadequate and needs to be altered."

Political and social groups 
The exclusion of social and political groups as targets of genocide in the CPPCG legal definition has been criticized by some historians and sociologists, for example, M. Hassan Kakar in his book The Soviet Invasion and the Afghan Response, 1979–1982 argues that the international definition of genocide is too restricted, and that it should include political groups or any group so defined by the perpetrator and quotes Chalk and Jonassohn: "Genocide is a form of one-sided mass killing in which a state or other authority intends to destroy a group, as that group and membership in it are defined by the perpetrator." In turn some states such as Ethiopia, France, and Spain include political groups as legitimate genocide victims in their anti-genocide laws.

Harff and Gurr defined genocide as "the promotion and execution of policies by a state or its agents which result in the deaths of a substantial portion of a group ... [when] the victimized groups are defined primarily in terms of their communal characteristics, i.e., ethnicity, religion or nationality". Harff and Gurr also differentiate between genocides and politicides by the characteristics by which members of a group are identified by the state. In genocides, the victimized groups are defined primarily in terms of their communal characteristics, i.e., ethnicity, religion or nationality. In politicides the victim groups are defined primarily in terms of their hierarchical position or political opposition to the regime and dominant groups. Daniel D. Polsby and Don B. Kates, Jr. state that "we follow Harff's distinction between genocides and 'pogroms', which she describes as 'short-lived outbursts by mobs, which, although often condoned by authorities, rarely persist'. If the violence persists for long enough, however, Harff argues, the distinction between condonation and complicity collapses."

According to Rummel, genocide has three different meanings. The ordinary meaning is murder by the government of people due to their national, ethnic, racial, or religious group membership. The legal meaning of genocide refers to the international treaty, the Convention on the Prevention and Punishment of the Crime of Genocide (CPPCG). This also includes non-killings that in the end eliminate the group, such as preventing births or forcibly transferring children out of the group to another group. 

Highlighting the potential for state and non-state actors to commit genocide in the 21st century, for example, in failed states or as non-state actors acquiring weapons of mass destruction, Adrian Gallagher defined genocide as 'When a source of collective power (usually a state) intentionally uses its power base to implement a process of destruction in order to destroy a group (as defined by the perpetrator), in whole or in substantial part, dependent upon relative group size'. The definition upholds the centrality of intent, the multidimensional understanding of destroying, broadens the definition of group identity beyond that of the 1948 definition yet argues that a substantial part of a group has to be destroyed before it can be classified as genocide.

Other proposed definitions of genocide include social groups defined by gender, sexual orientation, or gender identity.

Democide 
Democide, a term devised by American political scientist Rudolph Rummel, describes "the intentional killing of an unarmed or disarmed person by government agents acting in their authoritative capacity and pursuant to government policy or high command."   This definition covers any murder of any number of persons by any government, including but not limited to government mandated  forced labor, concentration camps, extrajudicial summary killings, civil wars, and mass deaths due to government neglect such as government induced famines like Holodomor. Rummel estimates that in the 20th century, democide resulted in over 262 million deaths.

Holocaust historian Yehuda Bauer agreed with Rummel that democide was a more appropriate term in more cases to describe mass atrocities than genocide due to the more inclusive definition of democide versus genocide.

Transgender genocide 

In 2013 some international trans activists introduced the term ‘transcide’ to describe the elevated level of killings of trans people globally. A coalition of NGOs from South America and Europe started the "Stop Trans Genocide" campaign. The term "trancide" follows an earlier term, gendercide. Legal scholars have argued that the definition of genocide should be expanded to cover transgender people, because they are victims of institutional discrimination, persecution, and violence. Brian Kritz argued that existing law should be extended to protect transgender people. Similar arguments have been made regarding extending the legal definition of "crimes against humanity." Aside from legal studies, transgender genocide has been examined by scholars of queer studies, hate studies, and other fields.

International prosecution

By ad hoc tribunals 

All signatories to the CPPCG are required to prevent and punish acts of genocide, both in peace and wartime, though some barriers make this enforcement difficult. In particular, some of the signatories—namely, Bahrain, Bangladesh, India, Malaysia, the Philippines, Singapore, the United States, Vietnam, Yemen, and former Yugoslavia—signed with the proviso that no claim of genocide could be brought against them at the International Court of Justice without their consent. Despite official protests from other signatories (notably Cyprus and Norway) on the ethics and legal standing of these reservations, the immunity from prosecution they grant has been invoked from time to time, as when the United States refused to allow a charge of genocide brought against it by former Yugoslavia following the 1999 Kosovo War.

It is commonly accepted that, at least since World War II, genocide has been illegal under customary international law as a peremptory norm, as well as under conventional international law. Acts of genocide are generally difficult to establish for prosecution because a chain of accountability must be established. International criminal courts and tribunals function primarily because the states involved are incapable or unwilling to prosecute crimes of this magnitude themselves.

Nuremberg Tribunal (1945–1946) 

The Nazi leaders who were prosecuted shortly after World War II for taking part in the Holocaust, and other mass murders, were charged under existing international laws, such as crimes against humanity, as the crime of "genocide' was not formally defined until the 1948 Convention on the Prevention and Punishment of the Crime of Genocide (CPPCG). Nevertheless, the recently coined term appeared in the indictment of the Nazi leaders, Count 3, which stated that those charged had "conducted deliberate and systematic genocide—namely, the extermination of racial and national groups—against the civilian populations of certain occupied territories in order to destroy particular races and classes of people, and national, racial or religious groups, particularly Jews, Poles, Gypsies and others."

International Criminal Tribunal for the Former Yugoslavia (1993–2017) 

The term Bosnian genocide is used to refer either to the killings committed by Serb forces in Srebrenica in 1995, or to ethnic cleansing that took place elsewhere during the 1992–1995 Bosnian War.

In 2001, the International Criminal Tribunal for the Former Yugoslavia (ICTY) judged that the 1995 Srebrenica massacre was an act of genocide. On 26 February 2007, the International Court of Justice (ICJ), in the Bosnian Genocide Case upheld the ICTY's earlier finding that the massacre in Srebrenica and Zepa constituted genocide, but found that the Serbian government had not participated in a wider genocide on the territory of Bosnia and Herzegovina during the war, as the Bosnian government had claimed.

On 12 July 2007, European Court of Human Rights when dismissing the appeal by Nikola Jorgić against his conviction for genocide by a German court (Jorgic v. Germany) noted that the German courts wider interpretation of genocide has since been rejected by international courts considering similar cases. The ECHR also noted that in the 21st century "Amongst scholars, the majority have taken the view that ethnic cleansing, in the way in which it was carried out by the Serb forces in Bosnia and Herzegovina in order to expel Muslims and Croats from their homes, did not constitute genocide. However, there are also a considerable number of scholars who have suggested that these acts did amount to genocide, and the ICTY has found in the Momcilo Krajisnik case that the actus reus of genocide was met in Prijedor "With regard to the charge of genocide, the Chamber found that in spite of evidence of acts perpetrated in the municipalities which constituted the actus reus of genocide".

About 30 people have been indicted for participating in genocide or complicity in genocide during the early 1990s in Bosnia. To date, after several plea bargains and some convictions that were successfully challenged on appeal two men, Vujadin Popović and Ljubiša Beara, have been found guilty of committing genocide, Zdravko Tolimir has been found guilty of committing genocide and conspiracy to commit genocide, and two others, Radislav Krstić and Drago Nikolić, have been found guilty of aiding and abetting genocide. Three others have been found guilty of participating in genocides in Bosnia by German courts, one of whom Nikola Jorgić lost an appeal against his conviction in the European Court of Human Rights. A further eight men, former members of the Bosnian Serb security forces were found guilty of genocide by the State Court of Bosnia and Herzegovina (See List of Bosnian genocide prosecutions).

Slobodan Milošević, as the former President of Serbia and of Yugoslavia, was the most senior political figure to stand trial at the ICTY. He died on 11 March 2006 during his trial where he was accused of genocide or complicity in genocide in territories within Bosnia and Herzegovina, so no verdict was returned. In 1995, the ICTY issued a warrant for the arrest of Bosnian Serbs Radovan Karadžić and Ratko Mladić on several charges including genocide. On 21 July 2008, Karadžić was arrested in Belgrade, and later tried in The Hague accused of genocide among other crimes. On 24 March 2016, Karadžić was found guilty of genocide in Srebrenica, war crimes and crimes against humanity, 10 of the 11 charges in total, and sentenced to 40 years' imprisonment. Mladić was arrested on 26 May 2011 in Lazarevo, Serbia, and was tried in The Hague. The verdict, delivered on 22 November 2017 found Mladić guilty of 10 of the 11 charges, including genocide and he was sentenced to life imprisonment.

International Criminal Tribunal for Rwanda (1994–present) 

The International Criminal Tribunal for Rwanda (ICTR) is a court under the auspices of the United Nations for the prosecution of offenses committed in Rwanda during the genocide which occurred there during April 1994, commencing on 6 April. The ICTR was created on 8 November 1994 by the Security Council of the United Nations in order to judge those people responsible for the acts of genocide and other serious violations of the international law performed in the territory of Rwanda, or by Rwandan citizens in nearby states, between 1 January and 31 December 1994.

So far, the ICTR has finished nineteen trials and convicted twenty-seven accused persons. On 14 December 2009, two more men were accused and convicted for their crimes. Another twenty-five persons are still on trial. Twenty-one are awaiting trial in detention, two more added on 14 December 2009. Ten are still at large. The first trial, of Jean-Paul Akayesu, began in 1997. Akayesu was the first person ever to be convicted of the crime of genocide. In October 1998, Akayesu was sentenced to life imprisonment. Jean Kambanda, interim Prime Minister, pleaded guilty.

Trials for deeds committed during the Rwandan genocide have also occurred in national courts, including Désiré Munyaneza, who in 2009 became the first man to be arrested and convicted in Canada on charges of war crimes and crimes against humanity, and Yvonne Ntacyobatabara Basebya, who in 2013 became the first Dutch citizen to be convicted for incitement to genocide.

Extraordinary Chambers in the Courts of Cambodia (from 2003) 

The Khmer Rouge, led by Pol Pot, Kang Kek Iew, Ta Mok and other leaders, organized the mass killing of ideologically suspect groups. The total number of victims is estimated at 1.7 million Cambodians between 1975 and 1979, including deaths from slave labour.

On 6 June 2003 the Cambodian government and the United Nations reached an agreement to set up the Extraordinary Chambers in the Courts of Cambodia (ECCC) which would focus exclusively on crimes committed by the most senior Khmer Rouge officials during the period of Khmer Rouge rule of 1975–1979. The judges were sworn in early July 2006.

The genocide charges related to killings of Cambodia's Vietnamese and Cham minorities, tens of thousand of whom are estimated to have been killed

The investigating judges were presented with the names of four suspects charged with genocide on 18 July 2007.
 Nuon Chea, a former prime minister, was indicted on charges of genocide, war crimes, crimes against humanity on 15 September 2010. His trial started on 27 June 2011 and ended on 7 August 2014, with a life sentence imposed for crimes against humanity.
 Khieu Samphan, a former head of state, was indicted on charges of genocide, war crimes, crimes against humanity on 15 September 2010. His trial began on 27 June 2011. and also ended on 7 August 2014, with a life sentence imposed for crimes against humanity.
 Ieng Sary, a former foreign minister, was indicted on charges of genocide, war crimes, crimes against humanity on 15 September 2010. His trial started on 27 June 2011, and ended with his death on 14 March 2013. He was never convicted.
 Ieng Thirith, a former minister for social affairs and wife of Ieng Sary, was indicted on charges of genocide, war crimes, crimes against humanity on 15 September 2010. Proceedings against her were suspended pending a health evaluation. In September 2012, she was released from prison due to advanced Alzheimer's disease; she died on 22 August 2015 at the age of 83 from complications of the disease.

By the International Criminal Court 
Since 2002, the International Criminal Court can exercise its jurisdiction if national courts are unwilling or unable to investigate or prosecute genocide, thus being a "court of last resort," leaving the primary responsibility to exercise jurisdiction over alleged criminals to individual states. Due to the United States concerns over the ICC, the United States prefers to continue to use specially convened international tribunals for such investigations and potential prosecutions.

Darfur, Sudan 

There has been much debate over categorizing the situation in Darfur as genocide. The ongoing conflict in Darfur, Sudan, which started in 2003, was declared a "genocide" by United States Secretary of State Colin Powell on 9 September 2004 in testimony before the Senate Foreign Relations Committee. Since that time however, no other permanent member of the UN Security Council has done so. In fact, in January 2005, an International Commission of Inquiry on Darfur, authorized by UN Security Council Resolution 1564 of 2004, issued a report to the Secretary-General stating that "the Government of Sudan has not pursued a policy of genocide." Nevertheless, the Commission cautioned that "The conclusion that no genocidal policy has been pursued and implemented in Darfur by the Government authorities, directly or through the militias under their control, should not be taken in any way as detracting from the gravity of the crimes perpetrated in that region. International offences such as the crimes against humanity and war crimes that have been committed in Darfur may be no less serious and heinous than genocide."

In March 2005, the Security Council formally referred the situation in Darfur to the Prosecutor of the International Criminal Court, taking into account the Commission report but without mentioning any specific crimes. Two permanent members of the Security Council, the United States and China, abstained from the vote on the referral resolution. As of his fourth report to the Security Council, the Prosecutor has found "reasonable grounds to believe that the individuals identified [in the UN Security Council Resolution 1593] have committed crimes against humanity and war crimes," but did not find sufficient evidence to prosecute for genocide.

In April 2007, the Judges of the ICC issued arrest warrants against the former Minister of State for the Interior, Ahmad Harun, and a Militia Janjaweed leader, Ali Kushayb, for crimes against humanity and war crimes.

On 14 July 2008, prosecutors at the International Criminal Court (ICC), filed ten charges of war crimes against Sudan's President Omar al-Bashir: three counts of genocide, five of crimes against humanity and two of murder. The ICC's prosecutors claimed that al-Bashir "masterminded and implemented a plan to destroy in substantial part" three tribal groups in Darfur because of their ethnicity.

On 4 March 2009, the ICC issued a warrant of arrest for Omar Al Bashir, President of Sudan as the ICC Pre-Trial Chamber I concluded that his position as head of state does not grant him immunity against prosecution before the ICC. The warrant was for war crimes and crimes against humanity. It did not include the crime of genocide because the majority of the Chamber did not find that the prosecutors had provided enough evidence to include such a charge. Later the decision was changed by the Appeals Panel and after issuing the second decision, charges against Omar al-Bashir include three counts of genocide.

Examples 

The concept of genocide can be applied to historical events. The preamble of the CPPCG states that "at all periods of history genocide has inflicted great losses on humanity." Revisionist attempts to challenge or affirm claims of genocide are illegal in some countries. Several European countries ban the denial of the Holocaust and the denial of the Armenian genocide, while in Turkey referring to the Armenian genocide, Greek genocide, and Sayfo, and to the period of mass starvation during the Great Famine of Mount Lebanon affecting Maronites, as genocides may be prosecuted under Article 301.

Historian William Rubinstein argues that the origin of 20th-century genocides can be traced back to the collapse of the elite structure and normal modes of government in parts of Europe following World War I, commenting:

According to Esther Brito, the way in which states commit genocide has evolved in the 21st century and genocidal campaigns have attempted to circumvent international systems designed to prevent, mitigate, and prosecute genocide by adjusting the duration, intensity, and methodology of the genocide. Brito states that modern genocides often happen on a much longer time scale than traditional ones - taking years or decades - and that instead of traditional methods of beatings and executions less directly fatal tactics are used but with the same effect. Brito described the contemporary plights of the Rohingya and Uyghurs as examples of this newer form of genocide. The abuses against West Papuans in Indonesia have also been described as a slow-motion genocide.

Stages, risk factors, and prevention 

Study of the risk factors and prevention of genocide was underway before the 1982 International Conference on the Holocaust and Genocide during which multiple papers on the subject were presented. In 1996 Gregory Stanton, the president of Genocide Watch, presented a briefing paper called "The 8 Stages of Genocide" at the United States Department of State. In it he suggested that genocide develops in eight stages that are "predictable but not inexorable".

The Stanton paper was presented to the State Department, shortly after the Rwandan Genocide and much of its analysis are based on why that genocide occurred. The preventative measures suggested, given the briefing paper's original target audience, were those that the United States could implement directly or indirectly by using its influence on other governments. In 2012, he added two additional stages, discrimination and persecution. 

Other authors have focused on the structural conditions leading up to genocide and the psychological and social processes that create an evolution toward genocide. Ervin Staub showed that economic deterioration and political confusion and disorganization were starting points of increasing discrimination and violence in many instances of genocides and mass killing. They lead to scapegoating a group and ideologies that identified that group as an enemy. A history of devaluation of the group that becomes the victim, past violence against the group that becomes the perpetrator leading to psychological wounds, authoritarian cultures and political systems, and the passivity of internal and external witnesses (bystanders) all contribute to the probability that the violence develops into genocide. Intense conflict between groups that is unresolved, becomes intractable and violent can also lead to genocide. In 2006, Dirk Moses criticised genocide studies due to its "rather poor record of ending genocide".

See also 

 Outline of Genocide studies
 Allport's Scale 
 Countervalue
 Cultural genocide
 Death squad
 Democide
 Ethnic cleansing
 Gendercide
 Genocide education
 Genocide of indigenous peoples
 Mass atrocity crimes
 Omnicide
 Policide
 Political cleansing of population
 Religious cleansing
 Utilitarian genocide

Research 

 Center for the Study of Genocide and Human Rights
 International Association of Genocide Scholars

Notes

References

Further reading

Articles 
 (in Spanish) Aizenstatd, Najman Alexander. "Origen y Evolución del Concepto de Genocidio". Vol. 25 Revista de Derecho de la Universidad Francisco Marroquín 11 (2007).  
 (in Spanish) Marco, Jorge. "Genocidio y Genocide Studies: Definiciones y debates", en: Aróstegui, Julio, Marco, Jorge y Gómez Bravo, Gutmaro (coord.): "De Genocidios, Holocaustos, Exterminios...", Hispania Nova, 10 (2012). Véase 
 Krain, M. (1997). "State-Sponsored Mass Murder: A Study of the Onset and Severity of Genocides and Politicides." Journal of Conflict Resolution 41(3): 331–360.

Books 
 
 
 
 
 
 
 
 
 
 
 
 
 
 
 
 Lewy, Guenter (2012). Essays on Genocide and Humanitarian Intervention. University of Utah Press. .
 
 
 
 
 
 
 
 
 Schmid, A. P. (1991). Repression, State Terrorism, and Genocide: Conceptual Clarifications. State Organized Terror: The Case of Violent Internal Repression. P. T. Bushnell. Boulder, Colorado, USA: Westview Press. 312 p.
 
 Overcoming Evil: Genocide, violent conflict and terrorism. New York: Oxford University Press.

External links

Documents

Research institutes, advocacy groups, and other organizations 
 
 
 
 
 
 
 
 
 
 
 
 

Killings by type
 
1940s neologisms
International criminal law
Mass murder
Racism